Rony Andrés Pérez Pérez (born 28 March 1984) is a Chilean former footballer who played as a midfielder for clubs in Chile and Mexico.

Career
A product of O'Higgins youth system, Pérez made twenty five appearances for the club in the Chilean Primera División in the 2007 season. He also played for Colchagua before joining Mexican side Cruz Azul Hidalgo in 2008.

Back in Chile, he joined Cobresal for the 2009 Apertura. In 2010, he played for Curicó Unido in the second level.

References

External links
 
 
 

1984 births
Living people
People from Cachapoal Province
Chilean footballers
Chilean expatriate footballers
O'Higgins F.C. footballers
Deportes Colchagua footballers
Cruz Azul Hidalgo footballers
Cobresal footballers
Curicó Unido footballers
Primera B de Chile players
Tercera División de Chile players
Chilean Primera División players
Ascenso MX players
Chilean expatriate sportspeople in Mexico
Expatriate footballers in Mexico
Association football midfielders